In the theory of von Neumann algebras, a part of the mathematical field of functional analysis, Tomita–Takesaki theory  is a method for constructing modular automorphisms of von Neumann algebras from the polar decomposition of a certain involution. It is essential for the theory of type III factors, and has led to a good structure theory for these previously intractable objects.

Modular automorphisms of a state

Suppose that M is a von Neumann algebra acting on a Hilbert space H, and Ω is a cyclic and separating vector of H of norm 1. (Cyclic means that MΩ is dense in H, and separating means that the map from M to MΩ is injective.) We write  for the vector state  of M, so that H is constructed from  using the Gelfand–Naimark–Segal construction. Since Ω is separating,  is faithful.

We can define a (not necessarily bounded) antilinear operator S0 on H with dense domain MΩ by setting  for all m in M, and similarly we can define a (not necessarily bounded) antilinear operator F0 on H with dense domain M'Ω by setting  for m in M′, where M′ is the commutant of M.

These operators are closable, and we denote their closures by S and F = S*. They have polar decompositions

 

Commutation theorem 
The main result of Tomita–Takesaki theory states that:
 

for all t and that
 

the commutant of M.

The modular conjugation operator J and the 1-parameter unitary group  satisfy

and

The Connes cocycle

The modular automorphism group of a von Neumann algebra M depends on the choice of state φ. Connes discovered that changing the state does not change the image of the modular automorphism in the outer automorphism group of M. More precisely, given two faithful states φ and ψ of M, we can find unitary elements ut of M for all real t such that

  
so that the modular automorphisms differ by inner automorphisms, and moreover ut satisfies the 1-cocycle condition

 
In particular, there is a canonical homomorphism from the additive group of reals to the outer automorphism group of M, that is independent of the choice of faithful state.

KMS states
The term KMS state comes from the Kubo–Martin–Schwinger condition in quantum statistical mechanics.

A KMS state  on a von Neumann algebra M with a given 1-parameter group of automorphisms αt is a state fixed by the automorphisms  such that for every pair of elements A, B of M there is a bounded continuous function F in the strip , holomorphic in the interior, such that

 

Takesaki and Winnink showed that any (faithful semi finite normal) state  is a KMS state for the 1-parameter group of modular automorphisms .

(There is often an extra parameter, denoted by β, used in the theory of KMS states. In the description above this has been  normalized to be 1 by rescaling the 1-parameter family of automorphisms.)

Structure of type III factors

We have seen above that there is a canonical homomorphism δ from the group of reals to the outer automorphism group of a von Neumann algebra, given by modular automorphisms.  The kernel of δ is an important invariant of the algebra. For simplicity assume that the von Neumann algebra is a factor. Then the possibilities for the kernel  of δ are:

 The whole real line. In this case δ is trivial and the factor is type I or II.
 A proper dense subgroup of the real line. Then the factor is called a factor of type III0.
 A discrete subgroup generated by some x > 0. Then the factor is called a factor of type IIIλ with 0 < λ = exp(−2π/x) < 1, or sometimes a Powers factor.
 The trivial group 0. Then the factor is called a factor of type III1. (This is in some sense the generic case.)

Left Hilbert algebras 

The main results of Tomita–Takesaki theory were proved using left and right Hilbert algebras.

A left Hilbert algebra is an algebra  with involution x → x♯ and an inner product (·,·) such that
 Left multiplication by a fixed a ∈  is a bounded operator.
 ♯ is the adjoint; in other words .
The involution ♯ is preclosed.
 The subalgebra spanned by all products xy is dense in  w.r.t. the inner product.

A right Hilbert algebra is defined similarly (with an involution ♭) with left and right reversed in the conditions above.

A (unimodular) Hilbert algebra is a left Hilbert algebra for which ♯ is an isometry, in other words . In this case the involution is denoted by x* instead of x♯ and coincides with modular conjugation J. This is the special case of Hilbert algebras. The modular operator is trivial and the corresponding von Neumann algebra is a direct sum of type I and type II von Neumann algebras.

Examples:

For a fixed left Hilbert algebra , let H be its Hilbert space completion. Left multiplication by x yields a bounded operator λ(x) on H and hence a *-homomorphism λ of  into B(H). The *-algebra  generates the von Neumann algebra

Tomita's key discovery concerned the remarkable properties of the closure of the operator ♯ and its polar decomposition. If S denotes this closure (a conjugate-linear unbounded operator), let Δ = S* S, a positive unbounded operator. Let S = J Δ1/2 denote its polar decomposition. Then J is a conjugate-linear isometry satisfying

Δ is called the modular operator and J the modular conjugation.

In , there is a self-contained proof of the main commutation theorem of Tomita-Takesaki:

 and 

The proof hinges on evaluating the operator integral:

By the spectral theorem, that is equivalent to proving the equality with ex replacing Δ; the identity for scalars follows by contour integration. It reflects the well-known fact that, with a suitable normalisation, the function  is its own Fourier transform.

Notes

References

Longer version with proofs

  

Operator theory
Von Neumann algebras